Toni Pulu (born 28 November 1989) is a rugby union player who currently plays as a wing for the Western Force in the Super Rugby competition.

Early life

Born in the United States, Pulu moved to New Zealand at the age of 3 and attended high school at Dilworth School in Auckland.   After leaving school, he played local club rugby for the Bombay rugby club, in the Counties Manukau local leagues in the suburbs of Auckland.

Senior career

Pulu began his professional career in New Zealand playing for the Counties Manukau Steelers during the 2012 ITM Cup. He immediately became a regular starter on the wing for the men from Pukekohe and his impressive performances helped them win the ITM Cup Championship and earn promotion to the Premiership for 2013.

Pulu remained try-less in 8 games through 2014 as Counties finished just outside the play-off places in 5th spot.   His try scoring form returned in 2015 with 3 tries in 9 appearances while injury held him back the following year, limiting him to just 4 appearances, in which he scored two 5-pointers in Counties Manukau's run to the Mitre 10 Cup semi-finals.

Super Rugby

As a result of 3 years of impressive domestic performances for Counties Manukau, Pulu earned a spot in the  wider training group for the 2015 Super Rugby season. Injuries prevented him from playing during his debut season in Hamilton, but he was retained in the wider training group for 2016. He made his debut for the Chiefs in the 53-10 win over the Western Force at FMG Stadium Waikato on 27 March 2016 and marked the occasion with a try. He was subsequently promoted to the full squad for the 2017 Super Rugby season.

International

Pulu has played sevens rugby for his ancestral home, Niue, with the highlight being his appearance at the 2011 Gold Coast Sevens. In 2018, due to being eligible for Australia despite having represented Niue, he moved to the Brumbies.

Career honours

Counties Manukau

Mitre 10 Cup Championship - 2012

Super Rugby statistics

References

1989 births
Living people
Rugby union wings
Counties Manukau rugby union players
Chiefs (rugby union) players
Male rugby sevens players
American people of Niuean descent
American emigrants to New Zealand
People educated at Dilworth School
ACT Brumbies players
Canberra Vikings players
Western Force players